Hjálmar Jónsson (born 17 April 1950) is a clergyman of the Evangelical Lutheran Church of Iceland. He is currently the pastor of the parish of Reykjavík Cathedral. He was a member of the Alþingi (Parliament of Iceland) 1995–2001.

References
List of church staff at the Reykjavík Cathedral's website. Retrieved 27 June 2012.
Biography of Hjálmar Jónsson (in Icelandic) at Alþingi's website. Retrieved 27 June 2012.

Living people
Hjalmar Johsson
Hjalmar Johsson
1950 births